Cleasby is a surname. Notable people with the surname include:

Anthony Cleasby (1804–1879), English judge
Ingram Cleasby (1920–2009), English churchman
Richard Cleasby (1779–1847), English philologist

See also
Clasby